{{Infobox film
| name           = Harrison's Flowers
| image          = Harrison's Flowers film poster.jpg
| caption        = United States theatrical poster
| director       = Elie Chouraqui
| producer       = Elie Chouraqui
| writer         = Elie ChouraquiDidier Le PêcheurIsabel Ellsen
| based_on       = 
| starring       = Andie MacDowellElias KoteasBrendan GleesonAdrien BrodyDavid Strathairn
| music          = Bruno Coulais (international version) Cliff Eidelman (USA version) 
| cinematography = Nicola Pecorini
| editing        = Jacques Witta
| studio         = Le Studio Canal+France 2 CinémaSept Films Cinema
| distributor    = Cinevia Films (France)Universal Pictures{{efn|The film was originally picked up for distribution<ref>{{cite web|title=Focus plants Flowers'|website=Variety|date=22 May 2001|access-date=15 April 2022|url=https://variety.com/2001/film/news/focus-plants-flowers-1117799893/}}</ref> and premiered in the United States by Universal's niche film label Universal Focus, but eventually released in theaters by Universal itself shortly after the label shut down.}} (United States)
| released       = 
| runtime        = 130 minutes
| country        = FranceUnited States
| language       = EnglishFrenchCroatian 
| budget         = $8 million
| gross          = 
}}Harrison's Flowers is a 2000 film by Elie Chouraqui. It stars, among others, Andie MacDowell, Elias Koteas, Brendan Gleeson, Adrien Brody, Marie Trintignant, Gerard Butler, and David Strathairn. The film is also Quinn Shephard's big screen debut. The film premiered at the 2000 San Sebastián International Film Festival, and released in theatres on 24 January 2001 in France. Universal Pictures released this film in the United States theatrically, then Lionsgate released this film in the United States on DVD.
For this film's United States version, the film's length was reduced by about 5 minutes; it also features a new score by Cliff Eidelman.

Plot
Harrison Lloyd, a Pulitzer Prize-winning Newsweek'' photojournalist, travels on his last assignment to the dissolving Yugoslavia in 1991, during the Croatian War of Independence. While there, he is presumed to have been killed in a building collapse. His wife travels to the region to find him, believing him to be in the city of Vukovar. Travelling through the war-torn landscape, she arrives in the city, and bears witness to the massacre which took place there. Back home, Harrison's son Cesar cares for his father's flowers in their greenhouse.

Cast

Reception
Rotten Tomatoes gives the film a critic score of 49% based on reviews from 86 critics.

Notes

References

External links
 
 
 

2000 films
2000s romance films
2000s war drama films
Films set in 1991
Films set in Croatia
Films about war correspondents
2000s French-language films
Croatian-language films
StudioCanal films
Universal Pictures films
French war drama films
War romance films
Works about the Croatian War of Independence
Films scored by Cliff Eidelman
Films shot in the Czech Republic
Films directed by Élie Chouraqui
Vukovar
Yugoslav Wars films
2000 drama films
Films scored by Bruno Coulais
2000s English-language films
2000s French films